Charles Danforth "Charley" Pettys (born April 25, 1990) is an American-born, Filipino professional footballer who plays as a defender for Global F.C.  He has also been a member of the Philippines national football team.

Early life and education 
Born on April 25, 1990, in Columbus, Ohio to an American father and Filipino mother, Pettys attended Bexley High School where he was a member of their soccer team.  Pettys and family moved to Pasadena, California in 2008.

Pettys attended the University of California, Santa Barbara in 2009 and was a student-athlete on the UC Santa Barbara Gauchos men's soccer team.  He appeared for the Gauchos in 5 games without recording a point before transferring to play on the Kentucky Wildcats men's soccer team.

Club career 
Pettys played with Cincinnati Kings for the 2008 PDL season prior to attending college, appearing in 9 games for the Kings.  He later played with Orange County Blue Star for the 2010 PDL season and the 2011 PDL season.

Pettys began his professional career with Los Angeles Blues of the USL Pro in 2013.  In January 2014, he joined Filipino side Global F.C., a first division team in the UFL.

Pettys rejoined Global F.C. in 2016.

International career 
Pettys, being eligible to represent both the United States (via birth) and the Philippines (via heritage on his mother's side), chose to join the Philippines national football team after being invited to the national team pool in February 2014 by head coach Thomas Dooley.  He made his international debut as a substitute in a 3–0 win over Nepal in Doha, Qatar on April 11, 2014.  His full international cap was the first by a Kentucky Wildcats player.

References

External links 
 Global FC player profile
 Kentucky Wildcats player profile
 UC Santa Barbara player profile

1990 births
Living people
American soccer players
Citizens of the Philippines through descent
Filipino footballers
Filipino expatriate footballers
Philippines international footballers
UC Santa Barbara Gauchos men's soccer players
Kentucky Wildcats men's soccer players
Cincinnati Kings players
Orange County Blue Star players
Orange County SC players
Soccer players from Columbus, Ohio
USL League Two players
USL Championship players
Global Makati F.C. players
American sportspeople of Filipino descent
Association football fullbacks
Association football defenders